Quilpué is a city and capital of the Marga Marga Province in central Chile's Valparaíso Region. It is part of the Greater Valparaíso metropolitan area.  It is widely known as "City of the Sun" (Ciudad del Sol) and the urban part of it also comprises the town of El Belloto, an area that showed rapid growth in the late 1990s.

Etymology
There are various theories about the origin of the word Quilpué. According to some, Quilpué means place where there are pigeons, arguing that pigeons were found abundantly in the area and that the name derives from the aboriginal words cullpo (dove) and hue (place). Other authors suggest that it means place of the stone lancet, because the Picunches (the indigenous Mapuche people) were experts in the manufacture of these items that were used for medical procedures.  Numbers of these stone lancets have been found in the area's archaeological sites, as well as the original formation which was quarried for them.

Tourism

Quilpué is called Ciudad del Sol because compared to Valparaíso, it has many more sunny days a year. It has metropolitan train, highway and bus connections to Viña del Mar and Valparaíso to the coast, and also towards inland cities. Since housing is cheaper in Quilpué, thousands of people commute every day to the coastal cities.

Quilpué is connected to Santiago through the Route 68, with an estimated travel time of 1.15h by car and 1.30h by inter-regional bus services, that departs and arrive mostly from Pajaritos metro and interchange station, west of the national capital.

Local attractions include a Zoo (only one of the Valparaíso Region), and the rural towns of Colliguay and the Marga-Marga Valley, both with facilities for camping and hiking.

City facts
Surface area: 
Population: 128,579 (67,249 females and 61,329 males) – 8.35% of the 5th Region's population.
Urban population: 98.69%
Rural population: 1.31%
(Source: 2002 census)

History
Indigenous peoples had settled the area long before Governor Pedro de Valdivia gave the land to Rodrigo de Araya in 1547. Mining was the main economic activity for many years, until the land was further divided in the 17th century.

Administration
Quilpué was made province capital when the Marga Marga province became effective March 11, 2010. The province was created by Law 20,368 on August 25, 2009.

As a commune, Quilpué is a third-level administrative division of Chile administered by a municipal council, headed by a mayor (alcalde) who is directly elected every four years. The 2008–2012 alcalde is Mauricio Viñambres Adasme. The city hall is located at 684 Vicuña Mackenna street. The council has the following members:
 Robert Knop Pisano (UDI)
 Heriberto Neira Robles (RN)
 Urzula Mir Arias (RN)
 Adriana Romaggi Chiesa (PS)
 Cristian Cardenas Silva (PDC)
 Roxana Sepúlveda Alarcón (PRSD)

Within the electoral divisions of Chile, Quilpué is represented in the Chamber of Deputies by Marcelo Schilling (PS) and Arturo Squella (UDI) as part of the 12th electoral district, (together with Olmué, Limache and Villa Alemana). The commune is represented in the Senate by Ignacio Walker Prieto (PDC) and Lily Pérez San Martín (RN) as part of the 5th senatorial constituency (Valparaíso-Cordillera).

Educational institutions
Campus housing part of the Pontificia Universidad Católica de Valparaíso Faculty of Engineering is located in the suburb of Valencia and Universidad de Aconcagua is located in Paso Hondo.

Sports
The city is home to the basketball club Colegio Los Leones de Quilpué which competes in the international Liga Sudamericana de Básquetbol and the national Liga Nacional de Básquetbol de Chile. The team plays its home games at the Gimnasio Colegio Los Leones.

References

External links
  Municipality of Quilpué

Populated places in Marga Marga Province
Capitals of Chilean provinces
Communes of Chile
Populated places established in 1898
1898 establishments in Chile